Innsmouth is a 2015 short horror film that was directed by Izzy Lee, who co-wrote and co-produced the film with Francesco Massaccesi. The film premiered on August 19, 2015 and is inspired by the works of H. P. Lovecraft, particularly The Shadow over Innsmouth.

The film received attention for its predominantly female cast, as many of Lovecraft's works tended to feature predominantly or solely male characters. Of this, Lee stated that "Innsmouth was created to make Lovecraft roll over in his grave a little by having the cast 98% female and switching the gender roles.”

Synopsis 
Detective Olmstead has arrived on a peculiar crime scene, with a body that has both a bite wound and an egg sac on her back. Her only clue is a photograph of the victim with a strange woman. Olmstead manages to determine that the photograph was taken in Innsmouth and travels there in search of answers, which causes her to cross paths with Alice Marsh.

Cast 
 Diana Porter as Detective Olmstead
 Tristan Risk as Alice Marsh
 Izzy Lee as Izzy
 Sophia Cacciola as Body
 Vera Schränkung as Henchwoman #1
 Porcelain Dalya as Henchwoman #2
 J. Zocalo as Cop #1
 Phil Healy as Cop #2

Reception 
Critical reception for the short has been positive and many outlets such as Rue Morgue praised Risk's acting and character. Dread Central complimented the film for "stick[ing] to the Lovecraftian legend and even has tons of the details of the town correct, right down to the year it was founded and the last name of Marsh, which was a critical moniker in the Innsmouth of the Lovecraftian universe." Starburst also praised Risk's role in the movie and commented that they wished that it had been longer, "as the mythology of the original novella could have been explored even further." Diabolique magazine commented that the film was "Lee’s most striking work. While she has collaborated with cinematographer Bryan McKay before, Innsmouth is by far and away their best joint effort." Icons of Fright's review was also positive, stating that Innsmouth "is exactly what short films should be: a glimpse of the talent behind the filmmaker and their stars, a story that leaves you wanting more, in the best of ways."

Awards 
 Best Short Screenplay at Monster Fest (2015, won)
 Best Supporting Actress at Vancouver Badass Short FF (2016, won - Tristan Risk)
 Best Short at GenreBlast Film Festival 2016

References

External links
 
 

Cthulhu Mythos films
2015 short films
2015 horror films
American horror short films
2010s crime films
Works based on The Shadow over Innsmouth
2015 films
2010s English-language films
2010s American films